2015 census may refer to:

Alberta municipal censuses, 2015
2015 Philippines population census